The Wolds is a term used in England to describe a range of hills which consists of open country overlying a base of limestone or chalk.

Geography
The Wolds comprise a series of low hills and steep valleys that are in the main underlain by calcareous (chalk and limestone) and sandstone rock, laid down in the Cretaceous and Jurassic periods. One exception to this is the North Leicestershire /South Nottinghamshire Wolds, which are underlain by sometimes chalky glacial till ('Oadby Till'). The characteristic open valleys of the Wolds were created during the last glacial period through the action of glaciation and meltwater. The chalk that underlies the Chalk Wolds Landscape Character Type extends from the Yorkshire Wolds to the south coast of England, in East Sussex and in Dorset. Geologically, the Lincolnshire Wolds is a continuation of the Yorkshire Wolds which runs through the East Riding of Yorkshire; the point at which the ranges of hill crosses the Humber is known as the Humber Gap.

Etymology
The name Wold is derived from the Old English  meaning "forest", (cognate of German Wald, but unrelated to English "wood", which has a different origin). Wold is an Anglian form of the word, as in other parts of England,  different variations can be found.

Over the years the meaning changed from "forest" to "high forest land". When the forests were cleared, the name was retained and applied to upland areas in general. This was particularly true in the Cotswolds, the  Lincolnshire Wolds and also the Yorkshire Wolds.

Example of Wolds in literature

See also

 The Weald (West Saxon variation)

Citations

References
 
 

Mountains and hills of England
Natural regions of England